Adam Clark Vroman (April 15, 1856, La Salle, Illinois - July 24, 1916, Altadena, California) was an American portrait photographer, known primarily for his portraits of indigenous peoples of the Southwestern United States. He was the founder and proprietor of Vroman's Bookstore - the oldest and largest independent bookshop in Southern California.

He originally worked for the railways in various positions. In 1892 he began taking landscape photographs, then opened a bookstore in Pasadena together with J.S. Glassock. From 1895, he visited the villages of the Hopi Native Americans for ten years, which he painted. In addition, he photographed the Navajo tribe. Later he also lectured on Indigenous Americans

In his photographs, he showed their facial features, but also realistic images of their dwellings and arranged simple genre scenes of their way of life. In the portrait, he combined documentary requirements with a cultivated rendering.

Vroman's Bookstore 
Vroman's Bookstore was founded by Adam Clark Vroman in 1894. It was then called Vroman's Book and Photographic Supply and was located at 60 E. Colorado St in Pasadena, California. Vroman was an avid photographer of the Southwest and Native American culture, and his interest in photographic equipment began a long-standing portfolio tradition in his bookstore.

Gallery

References

External links 
 Vroman's Bookstore

1916 deaths
1856 births
American photographers
Articles with VIAF identifiers
Articles with ULAN identifiers
Articles with Trove identifiers
Articles with SELIBR identifiers
Articles with RKDartists identifiers
Articles with PIC identifiers
Articles with NTA identifiers
Articles with NLA identifiers
Articles with LCCN identifiers
Articles with ISNI identifiers
Articles with GND identifiers
Articles with CINII identifiers
Articles with BNF identifiers